Mohammad Amin Hajmohammadi (born February 14, 1991) is an Iranian footballer .

Club career
Hajmohammadi started his career with Saipa. In the summer of 2011 he joined Malavan.

In the 2012–13 season he only appeared in four games for Naft, three times playing the whole length of the match and once being substituted in.

On June 25, 2015, he joined Esteghlal on a two-year contract.

Club career statistics

International

Under 22
He was invited to Iran U-22 by Alireza Mansourian to competing in 2013 AFC U-22 Asian Cup qualification.

References

External links
 Mohammad Amin Hajmohammadi at PersianLeague.com

1991 births
Living people
Saipa F.C. players
Naft Tehran F.C. players
Malavan players
Esteghlal F.C. players
Iran under-20 international footballers
Iranian footballers
People from Tehran
Association football defenders